Robert F. Kennedy, the 64th United States Attorney General, has frequently been depicted or referenced in works of popular culture.

Documentaries
Documentary filmmaker DA Pennebaker made several films featuring Kennedy. His short film Jingle Bells (1964) follows Kennedy and his children as they celebrate Christmas in New York City with local school children and Sammy Davis Jr. His later film Hickory Hill documents the 1968 Annual Spring Pet Show at Hickory Hill, the Kennedy Virginia estate.

In 1970, ABC-TV presented David L. Wolper's film The Unfinished Journey of Robert F. Kennedy, narrated by John Huston.

In 1973, Gérard Alcan directed and produced The Second Gun, a film about Kennedy's murder.

The documentary film, A Ripple of Hope (2008), retells Kennedy's call for peace during a campaign stop in Indianapolis, on April 4, 1968, the evening of the assassination of Martin Luther King Jr.

The documentary film, RFK in the Land of Apartheid: A Ripple of Hope (2010), follows his five-day visit to South Africa in June 1966, during which he made his famous Ripple of Hope speech at the University of Cape Town.

The documentary film, Ethel (2012), about the life of Ethel Kennedy, recounts many of the major personal and political events of Kennedy's life, through interviews with family members including Ethel herself, and news footage.

In 2018, Netflix released the 4-part documentary Bobby Kennedy for President that focused on his political rise and brief campaign for president in 1968.

Films and television

Kennedy's role in the Cuban Missile Crisis has been dramatized by Martin Sheen in the TV play The Missiles of October (1974) and by Steven Culp in Thirteen Days (2000).

He is portrayed by John Shea in the TV miniseries Kennedy (1983).

He is portrayed by Cotter Smith in the television miniseries Blood Feud (1983).

He is portrayed by Brad Davis in the three-part TV mini-series Robert Kennedy & His Times (1985), based on the book by Arthur M. Schlesinger Jr.

He is portrayed by Nicholas Campbell in the television mini-series Hoover vs. The Kennedys (1987).

He was portrayed by Kevin Anderson in Hoffa (1992) and by Željko Ivanek in the HBO film The Rat Pack (1998).

He is played by Linus Roache in the made-for-TV movie RFK (2002), which portrays his life from the time of his brother's assassination to his own death.

The film Bobby (2006) is the story of multiple people's lives leading up to RFK's assassination. The film employs stock footage from his presidential campaign, and he is briefly portrayed by Dave Fraunces.

Barry Pepper won an Emmy for his portrayal of Kennedy in The Kennedys (2011), an 8-part miniseries.

In the biographical movie J. Edgar (2011), RFK is played by Jeffrey Donovan.

He was played by Russell Lucas in Seven Days That Made a President (2013).

He is played by Peter Sarsgaard in the film about Jacqueline Kennedy, Jackie (2016).

He is played by Julian Ovenden in the TV series The Crown in the episode "Dear Mrs Kennedy" (2017).

He is played by Jack Huston in Martin Scorsese's film The Irishman (2019).

Other arts, entertainment, and media

Music
The Rolling Stones began recording the song "Sympathy for the Devil" on June 4, 1968. The original lyrics included the line, "I shouted out 'Who killed Kennedy?'", which was changed to, "I shouted out 'Who killed the Kennedys?'"

The song "Abraham, Martin and John" is a tribute to Abraham Lincoln, Martin Luther King Jr., John F. Kennedy and Robert F. Kennedy.

The song "Starlight" by Taylor Swift on her album Red is about the courtship of Robert F. Kennedy and his wife Ethel.

Novels

James Ellroy wrote a fictionalized historical version of Robert F. Kennedy in his Underworld USA Trilogy novels. He is an important secondary character, and appears in two of the three novels in the trilogy: American Tabloid and The Cold Six Thousand.

Plays

British playwright Roy Smiles' play about Kennedy's 1968 presidential campaign, The Last Pilgrim, was staged in London in 2010. It was shortlisted for Best Play at the Off West End Awards in the UK in 2011.

Robert F. Kennedy is the inspiration behind British theatre maker Russell Lucas's 'The Bobby Kennedy Experience' , directed by Sarah-Louise Young.

Poetry
Robert Lowell wrote several poems about Kennedy; his elegy for him includes the line, "doom was woven in your nerves".

References